NH 78 may refer to:

 National Highway 78 (India)
 New Hampshire Route 78, United States